Wanda Tettoni (March 8, 1910 – March 7, 1998) was an Italian actress and voice actress.

Biography
Tettoni was born in Siena in Tuscany and she made her big theatre debut in Milan when she was 16 years old. She even pursued an acting career in the radio industry during the 1940s, but she was more famous as a voice actress. She was the official Italian voice of Katharine Hepburn and Agnes Moorehead. Other actresses she dubbed included Jessica Tandy, Mary Wickes, Lucille Ball and Ginger Rogers. Tettoni's Italian dubbed character roles included Aunt Clara (portrayed by Marion Lorne) in Bewitched and the Elder Rose (portrayed by Gloria Stuart) in the 1997 film Titanic. This was one of her final dubbing roles before her death in 1998.

In her animated roles, Tettoni voiced Madame Adelaide Bonfamille in the Italian version of The Aristocats. Her other Disney dubbing roles included Queenie in One Hundred and One Dalmatians, Giddy in Dumbo and the Snooty Flower in Alice in Wonderland. She also dubbed Pearl Slaghoople in The Flintstones.

Death
Tettoni died in Rome on March 7, 1998, just one day before her 88th birthday.

Dubbing roles

Animation
Madame Adelaide Bonfamille in The Aristocats
Queenie in One Hundred and One Dalmatians
Snooty Flower in Alice in Wonderland
Giddy in Dumbo
Anastasia in Cinderella
The Witch in Snow White and the Seven Dwarfs (1972 redub)
Lila in Snoopy, Come Home
Betty Boop in Who Framed Roger Rabbit
Granny in Looney Tunes (1960s)
Pearl Slaghoople in The Flintstones
Agnes Skinner in The Simpsons (Season 1)

Live action
Rose Dawson Calvert in Titanic
Amanda Bonner in Adam's Rib
Tracy Lord in The Philadelphia Story
Pat Pemberton in Pat and Mike
Lutie Cameron in The Sea of Grass
Jade Tan in Dragon Seed
Mary Matthews in State of the Union
Christine Forrest in Keeper of the Flame
Ginny in Love Affair
Clara Schumann in Song of Love
Jamie Rowan in Without Love
Rebecca Prescott in How the West Was Won
Aggie Kennedy in Patch Adams
Aunt Clara in Bewitched
Sister Mary Lazarus in Sister Act
Norma Bates in Psycho
Baroness Aspasia Conti in Mrs. Parkington
Christine Hill Cosick in Fourteen Hours

References

External links

1910 births
1998 deaths
People from Siena
Italian voice actresses
Italian stage actresses
Italian radio actresses
20th-century Italian actresses